The 2017 BPL season, also known as BPL 5 or AKS BPL 2017 Powered by Shah Cement (for sponsorship reasons), was the fifth season of the  Bangladesh Premier League (BPL), the top level professional Twenty20 cricket franchise league in Bangladesh. The competition was organised by the Bangladesh Cricket Board (BCB) and features seven teams from seven different cities. The season began on 4 November, and ended on 12 December 2017, with the defending champion, Dhaka Dynamites played against newbies Sylhet Sixers in the first game at Sylhet International Cricket Stadium.

Barisal Bulls were excluded from the tournament, after failing financial terms and conditions. This year, Pakistani players, except retired and non-centrally-contracted were unavailable in the tournament till 17 November due to their domestic cricket league.

In the championship match, Rangpur Riders defeated Dhaka Dynamites to win their first title. In the final match Chris Gayle was awarded the man of the match award and also won player of the series award. He was the leading run scorer in the tournament with 485 runs. Shakib Al Hasan was the leading wicket taker with 22 wickets.

Draft
The 2017 BPL draft was held on 16 September 2017, where a team could purchase 7 local players and 2 overseas players at least. A new rule has been implemented whereby a team can include up to 5 overseas players in a match instead of up to 4.

A total of 66 players were signed in the event including 51 locals and 15 from abroad. Rangpur Riders signed the most players reaching a tally of 16. The first local and overseas player call went to Rajshahi Kings as the picked Mustafizur Rahman and Usama Mir.

Venues
A total of 46 matches was played in these venues with the playoffs and final  held in Dhaka.

Teams and their icons
The teams that played in this season are:
Chittagong Vikings - Soumya Sarkar
Comilla Victorians - Tamim Iqbal
Dhaka Dynamites - Shakib Al Hasan
Khulna Titans - Mahmudullah
Rajshahi Kings - Mushfiqur Rahim
Rangpur Riders - Mashrafe Mortaza
Sylhet Sixers - Sabbir Rahman

Mustafizur Rahman was chosen as the icon player for Barisal Bulls until they were excluded.

Results

Points table
 The top four teams will qualify for playoffs
  advanced to the Qualifier 1
  advanced to the Eliminator

League Progression

League stage

A total of 42 matches was played in the League stage, with the first eight held in Sylhet, next sixteen in Dhaka, next ten in Chittagong and final eight in Dhaka.

Phase 1 (Sylhet)

Phase 2 (Dhaka)

Phase 3 (Chittagong)

Phase 4 (Dhaka)

Play-offs

Preliminary

Eliminator

Qualifier 1

Qualifier 2

Final

Statistics

Most runs

Most wickets

Highest team totals

See also
 Chittagong Vikings in 2017
 Comilla Victorians in 2017
 Dhaka Dynamites in 2017
 Khulna Titans in 2017
 Rajshahi Kings in 2017
 Rangpur Riders in 2017
 Sylhet Sixers in 2017

References

External links 
 Series home on ESPN Cricinfo

Bangladesh Premier League seasons
2017 in Bangladeshi cricket
Bangladesh Premier League